René Strickler (born April 27, 1962) is an Argentine actor.

Telenovelas

Show hosting
 TVyNovelas Awards 2005 (2005)
 Oye Awards 2004 (2004) (TV)

External links 
 
 Biográfía de René Strickler (en esmas.com)
 Biografía de René Strickler en alma latina (en inglés)

1962 births
Living people
People from Córdoba, Argentina
Argentine male telenovela actors
Argentine people of German descent
Argentine people of British descent
Argentine emigrants to Mexico
Naturalized citizens of Mexico